James Rosenberg Tucker (1808-1888) was an Australian convict and author from Bristol, England.

Under the pseudonym Giacomo di Rosenberg, Tucker wrote his autobiographical Ralph Rashleigh; or, The Life of an Exile in 1844. It was published in a heavily edited form in 1929, and his original manuscript was published in 1952.

Tucker was convicted at the Chelmsford Spring Assizes on 3 March 1826 of blackmailing his cousin, James Stanyford Tucker. He was tried before Sir William Alexander, C.B., "On an indictment for sending a threatening letter...accus[ing] of an infamous crime" and sentenced to transportation for life. He was 18 years old at the time. The next year he was put aboard the convict ship Midas, which sailed for Sydney Cove. He arrived in Sydney in 1827 and worked at Emu Plains, New South Wales. Still a convict, he was sent to Port Macquarie in 1844. He was in Goulburn from 1849 to 1853.

References

External links
Peter Scott, "Tucker, James (1808–1888)" at Australian Dictionary of Biography

Australian writers
1800s births
1888 deaths
Convicts transported to Australia